Bruce Carter (born 14 June 1943) is a British rower. He competed in the men's coxed eight event at the 1968 Summer Olympics.

References

1943 births
Living people
British male rowers
Olympic rowers of Great Britain
Rowers at the 1968 Summer Olympics
People from Louth, Lincolnshire